San Pietro in Palazzi is a town in Tuscany, central Italy, administratively a frazione of the comune of Cecina, province of Livorno.

The town is about 33 km from Livorno and 2 km from Cecina.

Bibliography 
 

Frazioni of the Province of Livorno